HD 57821 is a single star in the southern constellation of Canis Major. It has a blue-white hue and is faintly visible to the naked eye with an apparent visual magnitude of 4.94. Based on parallax measurements, the distance to this object is approximately 480 light years. It is drifting further away with a radial velocity of +33 km/s, having come to within  some 4.3 million years ago.

The stellar classification of this star is B5 II/III, which matches the spectrum of a giant/bright giant although stellar models suggest it may still be on the main sequence. It has over four times the mass of the Sun and is 291 million years old. The star has a high rate of spin, showing a projected rotational velocity of 116 km/s.

References

B-type bright giants
Canis Major
Durchmusterung objects
Canis Majoris, 160
057821
035727
2818